The Mixed road race T1-2 cycling event at the 2012 Summer Paralympics took place on September 8 at Brands Hatch. Nineteen riders from sixteen nations competed. The race distance was 24 km. Results were not factored.

Results
DNF = Did Not Finish. DNS = Did Not Start. LAP=Lapped (8 km).

References

X Mixed road race T1-2